Easton Friends North Meetinghouse is a historic Quaker meeting house located at North Easton in Washington County, New York.  It was built in 1838 and is a one-story, rectangular brick structure with a gable roof.

It was listed on the National Register of Historic Places in 2005.

References

External links

Quaker meeting houses in New York (state)
Churches on the National Register of Historic Places in New York (state)
Churches completed in 1838
19th-century Quaker meeting houses
Churches in Washington County, New York
National Register of Historic Places in Washington County, New York